Brinsley Shaw (1876–1931) was an American stage, director and film actor of the silent era. He worked in over 150 films from 1910 to 1927.

Selected filmography

 Across the Plains (1911)
 The Tomboy on Bar Z (1912)
 The Wolf of Debt (1915)
 A Prince in a Pawnshop (1916)
 An Enemy to the King (1916)
 Arsene Lupin (1917)
 The Man of Mystery (1917)
 The Black Gate (1919)
 Hearts Are Trumps (1920)
 A Trip to Paradise (1921)
 The Curse of Drink (1922)
 The Strangers' Banquet (1922)
 The Barefoot Boy (1923)
 Stepping Lively (1924)
 The Cloud Rider (1925)
 Jimmie's Millions (1925)
 Before Midnight (1925)
 Don't (1925)
 The Prince of Pep (1925)
 Bucking the Truth (1926)

References

Bibliography
 George A. Katchmer. A Biographical Dictionary of Silent Film Western Actors and Actresses. McFarland, 2009.

External links

1876 births
1931 deaths
American male silent film actors
Male actors from New York City